The People's Democratic Movement (PDM) is a political party in Montserrat.

History
The party was established by the then leader of the opposition Donaldson Romeo on 30 April 2014, in order to contest the upcoming elections. The elections saw the party win seven of the nine seats in the Legislative Council, becoming the ruling party. However, two party members, Ingrid Buffonge and Gregory Willock, later left the party to join the opposition.

References

Political parties in Montserrat
Political parties established in 2014
2014 establishments in Montserrat
Conservative parties in British Overseas Territories